Von Südenfed is a collaboration between Andi Toma and Jan St. Werner (of Mouse on Mars), and Mark E. Smith, leader and vocalist of The Fall.

History
The three first collaborated on a 2004 12" double A-side entitled "Wipe that Sound"/"Cut the Gain", which was released on the Sonig label. This was followed by a full-length album, Tromatic Reflexxions, released on Domino Records in 2007, with two singles being drawn from the album.

The collaboration might seem unlikely in that the artists are from two very different musical genres. It has drawn comparisons to John Lydon's collaboration with Leftfield on the track "Open Up", which is similar in spirit, if not in sound.

Von Südenfed have been compared to LCD Soundsystem in reviews; Smith expressed displeasure at this comparison in interviews, and drew attention to the fact that LCD Soundsystem are heavily influenced by The Fall.

Following the cancellation of two Von Südenfed shows due to illness in December 2007, Smith stated that he had been "sacked" from the group. Despite this, he later performed live with Von Südenfed, and reportedly said that a second album was likely. However, there is no indication that sufficient material was recorded before Smith's death (in January 2018).

Discography
 "Wipe That Sound" 12" single (as "Mouse on Mars feat. Mark E. Smith") (2004)
 "Fledermaus Can't Get It" 12" single (2007)
 Tromatic Reflexxions CD/LP (2007)
 "The Rhinohead" b/w "Slow Down Ronnie" 12" single (2007)

References

External links
Domino Records: Von Südenfed
MySpace: Von Südenfed
, a video clip promoting science research in the EU with music from Von Südenfed ("Fledermaus Can't Get It")

British electronic music groups
German electronic music groups
British post-punk music groups
German post-punk music groups
Musical groups established in 2007
Musical trios